Joseph Martin (born 28 March 1995) is a professional rugby league footballer who plays as a  for Halifax Panthers in the Betfred Championship

Background
Martin was born in Halifax, West Yorkshire, England.

Career
Martin has previously spent time on loan at the Gloucestershire All Golds. and at Oldham RLFC (Heritage № 1394).

References

External links
Oldham profile
Halifax profile
Scoresway profile

1995 births
Living people
Dewsbury Rams players
English rugby league players
Gloucestershire All Golds players
Halifax R.L.F.C. players
Oldham R.L.F.C. players
Rugby league fullbacks
Rugby league players from Halifax, West Yorkshire